Armando Magliotto (26 October 1927 – 4 November 2005) was an Italian politician who served as president of Liguria (1979–1980) and Mayor of Savona (1990–1992).

References

Bibliography
 

1927 births
2005 deaths
Mayors of Savona
Presidents of Liguria
Italian Communist Party politicians
Democratic Party of the Left politicians